Linnie is a feminine given name which may refer to:

 Linnie Belcher, a member of the R&B girl group Allure
 Linnie Findlay (1919-2009), American writer and historian
 Linnie Haggard, to whom Abraham Lincoln dedicated a short poem - See Poetry of Abraham Lincoln
 Linnie Paterson, a singer with the Scottish progressive rock band Beggars Opera in 1973
 Linnie Marsh Wolfe (1881-1945), American librarian

See also
 Linny (disambiguation)
 Linney, a list of people with the surname

Feminine given names